Gmina Tereszpol is a rural gmina (administrative district) in Biłgoraj County, Lublin Voivodeship, in eastern Poland.

Villages
Gmina Tereszpol contains the villages and settlements of Bukownica, Lipowiec, Panasówka, Poręby, Szozdy, Tereszpol, Tereszpol-Kukiełki and Tereszpol-Zygmunty.

Neighbouring gminas
Gmina Tereszpol is bordered by the gminas of Aleksandrów, Biłgoraj, Józefów, Radecznica and Zwierzyniec.

References
Polish official population figures 2006

Tereszpol
Biłgoraj County